In probability and statistics, the Kumaraswamy's double bounded distribution is a family of continuous probability distributions defined on the interval (0,1). It is similar to the Beta distribution, but much simpler to use especially in simulation studies since its probability density function, cumulative distribution function and quantile functions can be expressed in closed form. This distribution was originally proposed by Poondi Kumaraswamy for variables that are lower and upper bounded with a zero-inflation. This was extended to inflations at both extremes [0,1] in later work with S. G . Fletcher.

Characterization

Probability density function
The probability density function of the Kumaraswamy distribution without considering any inflation is

and where a and b are non-negative shape parameters.

Cumulative distribution function
The cumulative distribution function is

Quantile function
The inverse cumulative distribution function (quantile function) is

Generalizing to arbitrary interval support
In its simplest form, the distribution has a support of (0,1).  In a more general form, the normalized variable x is replaced with the unshifted and unscaled variable z where:

Properties
The raw moments of the Kumaraswamy distribution are given by:

where B is the Beta function and Γ(.) denotes the Gamma function. The variance, skewness, and excess kurtosis can be calculated from these raw moments. For example, the variance is:

The Shannon entropy (in nats) of the distribution is:

where  is the harmonic number function.

Relation to the Beta distribution
The Kumaraswamy distribution is closely related to Beta distribution.
Assume that Xa,b is a Kumaraswamy distributed random variable with parameters a and b.
Then Xa,b is the a-th root of a suitably defined Beta distributed random variable.
One has the following relation between Xa,b and Y1,b.

with equality in distribution.

One may introduce generalised Kumaraswamy distributions by considering random variables of the form
The raw moments of this generalized Kumaraswamy distribution are given by:

However, in general, the cumulative distribution function does not have a closed form solution.

Related distributions
If  then  (Uniform distribution)
If   then 
If  (Beta distribution) then 
If  (Beta distribution) then 
If  then 
If  then 
If  then 
If  then 
If  then , the generalized beta distribution of the first kind.

Example
An example of the use of the Kumaraswamy distribution is the storage volume of a reservoir of capacity z whose upper bound is zmax and lower bound is 0, which is also a natural example for having two inflations as many reservoirs have nonzero probabilities for both empty and full reservoir states.

References

Continuous distributions